The Milarepa Fund is an American non-profit organization that raises money for and promotes awareness of the Tibetan independence movement.

History
The Milarepa Fund was founded in May 1994, by musician Adam Yauch and activist Erin Potts. The fund was named after the 11th century Tibetan singer-yogi Milarepa, and was originally intended to distribute royalties from Yauch's Beastie Boys' 1994 songs "Shambala" and "Bodhisattva Vow", which had sampled the chanting of Tibetan monks, to support Tibetan independence. The first action for the fund was during the 1994 Lollapalooza tour. Because the Beastie Boys were co-headlining the tour, the Milarepa Fund set up information tents to pass out pro-Tibetan independence pamphlets throughout the tour. Some fans were receptive to the pamphlets, but others were hostile, and later blamed Yauch's interest in the Milarepa Fund for the late release of the Beastie Boys' fifth album, Hello Nasty.

Expanding upon that idea, the Milarepa Fund put on a two-day concert in San Francisco's Golden Gate Park called the Tibetan Freedom Concert in 1996, which raised over $800,000 for Tibetan exile organizations. The success of the concert spawned a Free Tibet Tour that summer in conjunction with Students for a Free Tibet (SFT) and the International Campaign for Tibet (ICT). Other two-day concerts similar to the 1996 Tibetan Freedom Concert followed in 1997, 1998, and 1999. In 1998, the Milarepa Fund, SFT, and ICT organized a protest for Tibetan independence on Capitol Lawn, claiming an attendance of 15,000.

References

1994 establishments in the United States
Political organizations based in the United States
Tibetan independence movement